John T. Hewitt (born 1949 in Detroit, Michigan) is an American entrepreneur, the co-founder of Jackson Hewitt, sole founder of Liberty Tax Service and now CEO of ATAX. As of late 2006 Hewitt served as CEO, chairman of the board and president of the latter. Together these companies account for more than 10,000 tax preparation offices in the United States and Canada. In addition, John Hewitt was a pioneer in the development and use of specialized tax-preparation software, which is now the industry's standard practice.

Early life and education
Hewitt is a native of Detroit, Michigan. His parents moved to Greece, New York when he was four, and then to Hamburg, New York when he was 14. He graduated from Hamburg High School prior to enrolling at the University of Buffalo.

Career

1969-1981; Early career with H&R Block
Hewitt began his career in 1969, leaving the University of Buffalo early to become a tax preparer with H&R Block. Hewitt quickly moved through the ranks of the organization, becoming an assistance district manager for Western New York and then a district manager for the areas of Elmira, Corning, and Ithaca.   

By 1980 He was the youngest regional director at H&R Block running over 250 offices.

Hewitt perceived a need for technological innovation within the tax industry and he left H&R Block in order to pursue that opportunity. Working alongside his father, he pioneered the development of decision-tree tax-preparation software. However, H&R Block uninterested in the software, leading Hewitt to found a tax-preparation service that would exploit the efficiency of electronic tax preparation.

1982-1997; Jackson Hewitt

In August 1982 in Hampton Roads, Virginia after Hewitt and other investors acquired the six offices of a local tax-preparation company, Mel Jackson Tax Service and launched the "Hewtax" interview program, the first of its kind in the industry, that had been developed with his father. In 1988, the company changed its name to Jackson Hewitt. By 1986, the IRS began testing an electronic filing process, allowing taxpayers to directly file their taxes, bypassing mailing of returns entirely, benefitting Jackson Hewitt and other providers of electronically produced tax forms. Also in 1986, Jackson Hewitt began offering franchises in the United States.

According to Inc. Magazine, By 1992 Jackson Hewitt had attained a second place ranking within its industry and was one of the fastest growing private companies in the United States. The company became public in 1994. When it was sold for $483 million in 1997, it was operating 1,345 offices.

1997-2017; Liberty Tax Service

John Hewitt had left Jackson Hewitt at the time of its acquisition, and was contractually barred from competing with the company until 2000 within most areas of the United States. In order to avoid infringing on the terms of his non-compete contract, Hewitt initially focused the company's operations in Canada, purchasing a Canadian tax company on September 1, 1997.

As of 2012 Liberty Tax operated 4,000 offices in North America and had become the fastest-growing major tax-preparation company in history. Liberty Tax Service is best known for the costumed "wavers" dressed as the Statue of Liberty used in front of the offices across the country. During John's tenure at Liberty Tax Service, he wrote and published a book titled iCompete: How My Extraordinary Strategy for Winning Can Be Yours (copyright 2016).

2018-Present; Loyalty Brands
John Hewitt founded Loyalty Brands in 2018.  Loyalty Brands is an umbrella franchise company that manages twelve brands. The synergy between the brands allows franchisees to create a portfolio of several businesses that complement each other as a way to diversify and grow their entities.  Currently, Loyalty Brands manages several operational and sales aspects for the brands, four wholly owned wholly by Loyalty Brands, including ATAX Tax Service, Ledgers Accounting, Zoomin Groomin Mobile Pet Spa and Loyalty Business Brokers.

Honors and awards
 Small Business Influencer Champion Small Business Trends and Smallbiztechnology.com (2011) 
International Franchise Association Entrepreneur of the Year (2006)
Accounting Today Top 100 Most Influential People (2000–2012)
Ernst & Young Virginia Entrepreneur of the Year (2003)

Sources

Accounting Today's 100 Most Influential People

References

Businesspeople from Detroit
Living people
1949 births
University at Buffalo alumni
American chief executives of financial services companies